is a military aerodrome of the Japan Ground Self-Defense Force .

Operations
JGSDF Kisarazu is home to the JGSDF 1st Helicopter Brigade, which is attached to the Central Readiness Force. operating as a supporting unit for the 1st Airborne Brigade and the Japanese Special Forces Group. The base also supports tenant units from the Japan Maritime Self-Defense Force and Japan Air Self-Defence Force

History

Establishment and World War II
Kisarazu Air Field was originally established in 1936 as a base for the Imperial Japanese Navy Air Service, subordinate to the Yokosuka Naval District. It was home to the Kisarazu Air Group, the Imperial Japanese Navy's first dedicated land-based bomber unit, which saw extensive combat during the Second Sino-Japanese War and World War II. The base was also used for training, and the testing of experimental aircraft, including Japan's first jet-powered aircraft, the Nakajima Kikka.

Postwar period
After the end of World War II, from September 1945 the base was used by the United States Air Force as "Kisarazu Air Base". In 1956, the base was officially transferred to the control of the Japan Air Self-Defense Force (JASDF) and was used as a training base; although USAF units remained on the base in a tenant capacity until transferred to Tachikawa Air Base in 1961. Subsequently, American assets at Kisarazu came under the control of the United States Navy. In 1968, the JASDF relocated to Iruma Air Base, and Kisarazu was transferred to the control of the Japan Ground Self-Defense Force.

Remaining United States Navy assets were transferred to United States Fleet Activities Yokosuka from 1975, and there is currently no American presence at Kisarazu; however, under the terms of the Treaty of Mutual Cooperation and Security between the United States and Japan, Kisarazu Air Field remains available for use by aircraft of the United States 7th Fleet under the name "Kisarazu Auxiliary Landing Field".

Osprey maintenance hub
In 2014 the Japanese government publicly offered the base as a site for a maintenance hub for maintenance of V-22 Osprey tiltrotor aircraft operated by the United States Marine Corps from MCAS Futenma in Okinawa. The aircraft require maintenance every six years but the Futenma base lacks the facilities to do it.

The JGSDF will also be acquiring Ospreys which will be maintained at the facility. Fuji Heavy Industries (FHI) will conduct the maintenance. FHI engineers had their first chance to see Ospreys at Naval Air Facility Atsugi in April 2016. Noise level tests were conducted at Kisarazu in October 2016, comparing the Osprey noise to that of a CH-47 Chinook. There was some opposition from local residents. Maintenance of the aircraft was to begin from 2017. An opening ceremony was held on January 12, 2017.

References

Japanese airbases
Japan Ground Self-Defense Force bases
Imperial Japanese Navy Air Service